Orthacodontidae is an extinct family of sharks in the order Synechodontiformes. It contains twelve species within three genera. Some authors included it into Hexanchiformes or Lamniformes.

Species
 Occitanodus Guinot, Cappetta & Adnet, 2014
 Occitanodus sudrei Guinot, Cappetta & Adnet, 2014
 Orthacodus Woodward, 1889
 Orthacodus longidens Agassiz, 1843
 Sphenodus Agassiz, 1843
 Sphenodus alpinus Gümbel, 1861
 Sphenodus longidens Agassiz, 1843
 Sphenodus lundgreni Davis, 1890
 Sphenodus macer Quenstedt, 1852
 Sphenodus nitidus Wagner, 1862
 Sphenodus planus Agassiz, 1843
 Sphenodus rectidens Emmons, 1858
 Sphenodus robustidens Seguenza, 1900
 Sphenodus tithonius Gemmellaro, 1871
 Sphenodus virgai Gemmellaro, 1871

References

Jurassic sharks
Cretaceous sharks
Hexanchiformes
Shark families
Prehistoric cartilaginous fish families
Callovian first appearances
Selandian extinctions